Blair Connor born 29 September 1988 in Brisbane, Australia is a rugby union player from Brisbane, Australia. He played for the Queensland Reds in the 2009 Super 14 season and the 2010 Super 14 season. Blair Connor is capable of playing at either centre or wing.

He signed for the Reds while he was still a teenager in 2008 and was a regular in their starting line-up.

In June 2010, he announced he had signed a two-year deal with the French Pro D2 and now Top 14 team, Union Bordeaux Bègles.

References

External links
 
 

1988 births
Living people
Rugby union wings
Australian rugby union players
Sportsmen from Queensland
Rugby union players from Brisbane
Australian expatriate rugby union players
Expatriate rugby union players in France
Australian expatriate sportspeople in France
Union Bordeaux Bègles players
Queensland Reds players